The Climate Crisis Advisory Group (CCAG) is an independent group of scientists which advises on climate change and biodiversity, headed by Sir David King.

The group is funded by the Centre for Climate Repair.

Its goal is to  "provide the global public with regular analysis about efforts to tackle the global heating and biodiversity crises".

CCAG's launch statement and first report  state that the Earth may have already passed several dangerous tipping points, including melting ice sheets, the slowdown of Atlantic circulation and the dieback of the Amazon rainforest, which highlight the need for speed.

Members 
Members of the CCAG are scientists from multiple disciplines that are all advocates for the environment. The group was formed so that every continent (besides Antarctica) was represented. All members volunteer their time to the group. Members include:

 Nerilie Abram
 Ade Adepitan - Presenter
 Laura Diaz Anadon
 Dr. Fatih Birol    Executive Director of the International Energy Agency (IEA) 
 Mercedes Bustamante
 Dr. Robert W. Corell
 Dr. Arunabha Ghosh
 Sir David King - Chair
 Dr. Klaus Lackner
 Mark Maslin
 Dr. Tero Mustonen
 Lavanya Rajamani
 Johan Rockström
 Dr. Tara Shirvani - Associate
 Lorraine Whitmarsh
 Qi Ye

References

External links 

 List of CCAG Reports
 CCAG press releases
 CCAG Youtube channel where they stream their monthly meetings

Climate change
Biodiversity